V. M. Myasishchev Experimental Design Bureau (Экспери­мен­тальный Машин­ост­роительный Завод им. В. М. Мясищева) or OKB-23, founded in 1951 by MGB UdSSR Vladimir Myasishchev, was one of the chief Soviet aerospace design bureaus until its dissolution in 1960. Vladimir Myasishchev went on to head TsAGI. In 1967, Myasishchev left TsAGI and recreated his bureau, which still exists to this day. The bureau prefix was "M." , its workforce is estimated at approx­imately one thousand. Myasishchev and NPO Molniya intend to use the V-MT or M-55 as launch vehicle for sub-orbital spaceflight.

In July 2014, the merger of Myasishchev and Ilyushin to create a single modern production complex was announced by the Board of Directors of OAO Il.

Products

1940-1960
VM-1/DVB-102: prototype long-range, high-altitude bomber, 1940
VM-2: projected version of VM-1 with M-20 diesel engines, 1940
VM-3/DVB-102N: projected version powered by M-120TK engines, 1940
VM-4: prototype version powered by M-71TK-3 engines, 1943
VM-5/DVB-102DM: projected version powered by MB-102TK engines, 1942
VM-6/Pe-2M-1: Pe-2 with M-1 engines, 1943
VM-7/Pe-2B
VM-8/Pe-2D (Pe-6)
VM-9/Pe-2S
VM-10/Pe-3M
VM-11/Pe-2K
VM-12/Pe-2I
VM-13/Pe-2M
VM-14/DIS: long-range escort fighter prototype, 1945
VM-15/Pe-2RD
VM-16/DB-108: long-range bomber prototype developed from the Pe-2, 1944
VM-17/DB-II-108: prototype three crew version of VM-16, 1945
VM-18: prototype four crew version of VM-16 with increased length and wingspan, 1945
VM-19/VB-109: VM-17 rebuilt for two crew and same wingspan as the VM-16 and VM-17, 1945
VM-20/Pe-2F
VM-21/Pe-2R
VM-22/DVB-202: projected four-engine strategic long-range, high-altitude bomber, 1944
VM-23/DVB-302: projected four-engine strategic long-range, high-altitude bomber, 1945
VM-24/RB-17: projected tactical jet bomber, 1945
M-25/M-4 "Bison": company designation for M-4
M-26 (I): M-4 powered by VD-7 engines, 1951
M-26 (II): projected four-engine military transport aircraft, 1960
M-27: projected two or four engine jet airliner, 1952
M-28/2M: four-engine high-altitude bomber, 1951
M-29/M-6P: projected airliner derived from the M-4, 1953
M-30 (I): projected high-altitude reconnaissance aircraft, 1953
M-30 (II): nuclear powered canard wing supersonic bomber, 1959
M-31: projected transonic strategic bomber, 1952
M-32: projected delta-wing supersonic strategic bomber, 1953
M-33: Yak-1000 development, 1951
M-34: transonic bomber, 1953
M-36: company designation for 3M
M-39: 3M powered by VD-7V turbojets, 1957
M-50 "Bounder" prototype supersonic bomber, 1954
M-51: unmanned M-50, 1956
M-52: supersonic strategic missile carrier developed from the M-50, 1956
M-53: projected SST, 1958
M-54: tailless delta-wing supersonic strategic missile carrier, 1959
M-55: various SST studies, 1958
M-56: canard or delta supersonic strategic missile carrier, 1956
M-57: nuclear powered bomber project, 1959
M-58: tailless supersonic bomber, 1958
M-59: canard wing supersonic missile carrier, 1959
M-60: nuclear powered bomber project, 1955
M-70: supersonic flying boat, 1955

1967-present
 M-12: STOL/VTOL utility aircraft, 1968
 M-13: military transport, 1968
 M-17 "Mystic-A": high-altitude reconnaissance aircraft, 1970
 M-18: supersonic bomber design, 1972
 M-19: hypersonic air and space plane; various engine and fuel types, 1974
 M-20: strategic multi-regime supersonic bomber, many aerodynamic configurations, 1968
 M-25: supersonic attack aircraft, used its own shockwave as a weapon, 1969
 M-35/VM-T: 2 M-4s converted to carry the space shuttle Buran, 1977
 M-52 eight-engine heavy transport aircraft, 1979
 M-55 "Mystic-B": high-altitude research and reconnaissance aircraft, 1985
 M-60: widebody aircraft project
 M-61/M-17PV: development of M-17, 1984
 M-62 Oryol: high-altitude remote-controlled drone, 1975
 M-63: high-altitude aircraft, 1981
 M-65/M-17P: M-17 development, 1986
 M-67: high-altitude observation aircraft, 1987
 M-70 Gzhel: single-engine business/executive transport aircraft, 1989; renamed to M-101
 M-72 Yamal twin-engine amphibious aircraft, 1989
 M-80 two or four-engine VTOL transport aircraft, 1994
 M-90 Air Ferry: very heavy multi-purpose transport project, 1992. Not built.
 M-101 Gzhel: single-engine business/executive transport aircraft, 1992
 M-102 Duet: twin-engine business/executive transport aircraft, 1989
 M-103 Skif: experimental heavy bomber, 1990
 M-104: project
 M-105: twin-engine business/executive transport aircraft developed from the M-102, 1994
 M-111: twin-engine business/executive transport project, revision of 1975 German AMC-111 project, 1993
 M-112: twin-engine business/executive transport aircraft, German-Russian joint project, 1993
 M-120: twin-engine business/executive transport aircraft
 M-121: twin-engine business/executive transport aircraft
 M-150: twin-engine, 150 passenger short-range airliner, 1995
 M-200 Master: military advanced trainer project, 1992. Not built.
 M-201 Sokol: twin-engine business/executive transport aircraft, 1992
 M-202 Olyon: 19 passenger twin-engine feederliner developed from the M-102, 1997
 M-203 Barsuk: single-engine light utility aircraft, 1995
 M-205: two-seat light attack aircraft, 1996
 M-207: advanced trainer developed from the M-205, 1996
 M-302 Kuryer: twin-engine business/executive transport aircraft for Iran, 1993
 M-500: agricultural utility aircraft

Spacecraft
 Space Adventures C-21
 Space Adventures M-55X
 Buran program, cockpit
 Cosmopolis XXI suborbital craft

Missiles
 RSS-40 Buran, nuclear cruise missile project
 M-44 aerospace vehicle project
 Myasishchev Project 46 spaceplane project
 Myasishchev Project 48 spaceplane project
 M-48/VKA-23 spaceplane project

References

Bibliography

External links

 Official site, in English and Russian.
 globalsecurity.org
 Encyclopædia Astronautix
 Myasishchev history

 
Aircraft manufacturers of Russia
Aircraft manufacturers of the Soviet Union
United Aircraft Corporation
Myasishchev aircraft
Design bureaus